Can't Fight Fate is the second studio album by American singer and songwriter Taylor Dayne, released on October 7, 1989, by Arista Records. The album continued her chart success and was certified 2× Platinum by the Recording Industry Association of America (RIAA). It includes the Billboard Hot 100 top-ten singles "With Every Beat of My Heart" (#5) and "I'll Be Your Shelter" (#4), the number one "Love Will Lead You Back" and the top 20 hit, "Heart of Stone" (#12).

Critical reception
AllMusic editor Jose F. Promis declared the album's ballads as "lush and dramatic", mentioning "Love Will Lead You Back". However, he felt that the "real killers" are the rock songs, which Dayne "delivers like a true, seasoned rock star", noting that "I'll Be Your Shelter" "brings to mind Tina Turner". Promis highlighted also "You Can't Fight Fate" and "Ain't No Good", and concluded, "Years after its release, this album stands the test of time, and can safely be classified as one of the more diverse and exciting dance/pop/rock albums of the late '80s/early '90s." People stated, "Not many singers can go from hot to dreamy and back again as smoothly as Dayne does on this first-rate album." The reviewer felt the singer "has the spirit and rhythmic sense" to turn "I'll Be Your Shelter" into "a vivacious party track", but remarked that she also can "dig for depth and rich tone" on ballads, such as "Love Will Lead You Back".

Track listing

Personnel 
 Taylor Dayne – lead vocals, backing vocals (2, 5, 10), arrangements (10)
 Rich Tancredi – keyboards (1-4, 6–10), arrangements (1, 3, 4, 6–10)
 Tommy Byrnes – guitars (2, 10), rhythm guitar (5), backing vocals (10)
 Bob Cadway – guitars (3, 4, 7, 8, 9)
 Blues Saraceno – lead guitar (5)
 Kevin Jenkins – bass (2)
 T.M. Stevens – bass (5)
 Joe Franco – drums (1-5, 7–10)
 Richie Jones – drum programming (6)
 Joel Peskin – sax solo (1, 9)
 Richie Cannata – saxophone (4, 5, 7)
 Jerry Hey – trumpet (1, 9), trumpet arrangements (1), horn arrangements (9)
 Gary Grant – trumpet (1, 9)
 Bill Reichenbach Jr. – trumpet (1), trombone (9)
 Paul Tuthill – trumpet (5)
 Ric Wake – arrangements 
 Jamillah Muhammad – backing vocals (1, 3–10)
 Ricky Nelson – backing vocals (1, 3, 7)
 Billy T. Scott – backing vocals (1, 3–10), BGV arrangements (1, 3, 4, 8)
 Gloria Weems – backing vocals (1, 4)
 Kathy Troccoli – backing vocals (2)

Production 
 Clive Davis – executive producer
 Ric Wake – producer 
 Bob Cadway – recording, mixing
 Greg Arnold – assistant engineer
 Thom Cadley – assistant engineer
 Robert "Void" Caprio – assistant engineer
 Susan Gibbons – assistant engineer
 Dan Hetzel – assistant engineer
 Rail Rogut – assistant engineer
 Brett Swain – assistant engineer
 Mario Vasquez – assistant engineer
 Thomas R. Yezzi – assistant engineer
 Greg Calbi – mastering at Sterling Sound (New York City, New York)
 David Barratt – production coordinator
 Susan Mendola – art direction
 Wayne Maser – photography
 Philippe Becker – hair stylist, make-up artist
 Juliet Cuming – styling
 Champion Entertainment Organization, Inc. – management

Charts

Weekly charts

Year-end charts

Certifications

References 

Taylor Dayne albums
1989 albums
Arista Records albums
Albums produced by Ric Wake
Pop rock albums by American artists